Events from the year 2002 in Belgium

Incumbents
Monarch: Albert II
Prime Minister: Guy Verhofstadt

Events
January
 1 January – Reform of Belgian local police territories into 28 "zones" comes into effect.

April
 World's first fetoscopic tracheal occlusion for congenital diaphragmatic hernia carried out in UZ Leuven.

June
 13 June – Peter Carmeliet awarded the Francqui Prize for his work in the biological and medical sciences.

August
 3-4 August – 2002 Spa 24 Hours won by Larbre Compétition

September
 1 September – 2002 Belgian Grand Prix at the Circuit de Spa-Francorchamps won by Michael Schumacher.
 21 September – Antwerp fashion museum opens.

October
 30 October – Frank De Winne's first spaceflight begins. 

December
 4 December – Xavier Deutsch awarded the Prix Rossel for La Belle Étoile.

Art and architecture
Buildings
 Poelaert Elevators in Brussels inaugurated
 Art Deco Flagey Building, former national broadcasting headquarters, reopens as a cultural centre after renovations.

Births
 15 January – Jannes Van Hecke, footballer
 2 May – Killian Sardella, footballer
 8 August – Marco Kana, footballer
 21 August – Isaac Asante, footballer

Deaths

January
 15 January – Jean Dockx, footballer (born 1941)
 28 January – Gustaaf Deloor, cyclist (born 1913)

February
 11 February – Frans Van Coetsem, linguist (born 1919)

March
 23 March – Marcel Kint, cyclist (born 1914)

April
 20 April – Pierre Rapsat, singer-songwriter (born 1948)

June
 7 June – Lilian, Princess of Réthy (born 1916)

November
 19 November – Prince Alexandre de Mérode (born 1934)

See also
2002 in Belgian television

References

 
Years of the 21st century in Belgium
Belgium
2000s in Belgium
Belgium